Wilhelm Harreither (born 27 October 1945) is a retired Austrian football goalkeeper who played for Austria. He also played for SK Amateure Steyr and Linzer ASK.

External links

 
 

1945 births
Austrian footballers
Austria international footballers
Association football goalkeepers
LASK players
Living people